The Forks may refer to:

Places

Canada 
The Forks, Winnipeg, Manitoba, a district around the confluence of the Red River of the North and Assiniboine River
Saskatchewan River Forks, where the North Saskatchewan and South Saskatchewan rivers combine to form the Saskatchewan River

United States 
The Forks, California, unincorporated community in Mendocino County
The Forks, Kentucky
The Forks, Maine, a small community

The Forks, a common nickname given to Greater Grand Forks, the cities of Grand Forks, North Dakota and East Grand Forks, Minnesota
"The Forks", the original settlement which preceded Burlington, North Dakota, near the confluence of the Des Lacs River and the Mouse River
"The Forks", a critically and commercially panned band from Minnesota, that set a record for most reports on a Spotify page in platform history

Other uses
"The forks", referring in Australian English to the "V sign", which may be used as an insulting or obscene gesture

See also 
The Fork, an online restaurants booking system
Forks (disambiguation)
Fork (disambiguation)